Florine de Leymarie (born 9 May 1981) is a French Alpine skier. She participated in the 2006 Olympic Winter Games in Turin. She was named Rookie of the year 2005 alongside David Poisson by the French Ski federation.

Results

World Cup
 Best overall World Cup position: 53rd in 2005
 Best position in slalom: 18th in 2005
 Best position in a stage of the World Cup: 4th.

References

Living people
1981 births
Sportspeople from Albertville
French female alpine skiers
Alpine skiers at the 2006 Winter Olympics
Olympic alpine skiers of France